Kevin Daniells (born 19 May 1999) is an Australian-born Samoan footballer who plays as a defender for the Samoa national football team and Innisfall United. He is the brother of Samoan woman's footballer Matalena Daniells.

Daniells is based in Brisbane, Australia.

In June 2019 he was named to the squad for the 2019 Pacific Games.

References

External links
Kevin Daniells at National Football Teams

1999 births
Living people
People with acquired Samoan citizenship
Samoan footballers
Association football defenders
Samoa international footballers
Australian soccer players
Australian sportspeople of Samoan descent